Nica Digerness (born March 21, 2000) is an American pair skater. With her former partner, Danny Neudecker, she is the 2017 U.S. national junior champion and placed 10th at the 2017 World Junior Championships. Since July 7, she is now paired with Mark Sadusky.

Personal life 
Digerness was born on March 21, 2000, in Loveland, Colorado. She is the daughter of Savannah Mclean, and Theo Digerness, a former gymnast. She has a brother, Nico. She was raised in Greeley, Colorado. She attended Mountain View Academy and was later homeschooled.

Career

Early years & Beginning of Parternship 
Digerness began learning to skate in 2010. As a young child, she was coached by Kristin Conroy at the Greeley Ice Haus. She competed in juvenile ladies' singles in the 2013–2014 season and moved up to the intermediate level the following season.
She then moved to the Ft. Collins rink, where Heidi and Paul Thibert coached her. Nica did both singles and pairs for awhile until 
Pair skating coach Dalilah Sappenfield introduced Digerness to Danny Neudecker, who was also a single skater at the time. The two teamed up in January 2015 and decided to train under Sappenfield at the Broadmoor World Arena in Colorado Springs, Colorado. They placed 7th in novice pairs at the 2016 U.S. Championships.

2016–2017 season 
Digerness/Neudecker dropped plans to continue in the novice ranks after obtaining good junior results at summer club events. In September 2016, they debuted on the ISU Junior Grand Prix series, placing 7th in Saransk, Russia. The following month, the pair finished 13th in Dresden, Germany.

In January, they won the junior title at the 2017 U.S. Championships, having placed first in both segments, and were named in the U.S. team to the 2017 World Junior Championships in Taipei, Taiwan. Ranked 13th in the short program and 9th in the free skate, the pair finished 10th overall in Taipei.

2017–2018 season 
Digerness/Neudecker began competing on the senior level. They placed 9th in the short, 11th in the free, and 11th overall at the 2018 U.S. Championships, just missing being in the top 10. They received no international assignments. Following the U.S. Championships, the pair focused on skating skills and choreography for several months while Neudecker recuperated from three bulging disks in his back and joint issues.

2018–2019 season 
Making their senior international debut, Digerness/Neudecker placed fourth at the 2018 CS Lombardia Trophy, an ISU Challenger Series competition in September. U.S. Figure Skating invited them to a Grand Prix event, the 2018 Skate America in October.  They placed sixth. They placed eighth at the [[2018 U.S. Figure Skating Championships|2019 U.S. Championships.

2019-2020 season & New Parternship 

Digerness and Neudecker competed at the 2019 Warsaw Cup, where they placed fourteenth. They then competed at the 2020 U.S. Championships, where they placed ninth.  On March 28, Neudecker announced that the pair had split.
On May 21, Digerness announced a new partnership with Ian Meyh.

Programs 
(with Neudecker)

Competitive highlights 
GP: Grand Prix; CS: Challenger Series; JGP: Junior Grand Prix

Pairs with Sadusky

Pairs with Neudecker

Ladies' singles

References

External links 
 

2000 births
American female pair skaters
Living people
People from Greeley, Colorado
21st-century American women